Peter Yariyok Jatau (5 August 1931 – 16 December 2020) was a Nigerian Roman Catholic archbishop.

Jatau was born in Nigeria and was ordained to the priesthood in 1963. He served as coadjutor archbishop of the Roman Catholic Archdiocese of Kaduna, Nigeria, from 1972 to 1975 and as archbishop of the archdiocese from 1975 to 2007.

Notes 

1931 births
2020 deaths
Roman Catholic archbishops of Kaduna